Cyamops micronesicus is a species of fly.

References

micronesicus
Insects described in 2000